Richard John Parkhouse (2 March 1910 – 1 January 1984) was a cricketer. A right-handed batsman, he played internationals for Egypt and Nigeria and first-class cricket for Glamorgan.

Biography

Born in Clydach in 1910, Richard Parkhouse started his cricket career playing for his local club and Llanelli in the 1930s before becoming a teacher in Egypt. Whilst in Egypt, he played for the Egyptian national side against HM Martineau's XI in Cairo in April 1939, scoring a century in the first innings.

In July of that year, he played his only two first-class matches for Glamorgan against Hampshire and Surrey. After World War II, he played two matches for Nigeria against the Gold Coast in Lagos and eventually became a coach in Scotland.

References

External links
Rootsweb profile

1910 births
1984 deaths
English cricketers
Egyptian cricketers
Nigerian cricketers
Glamorgan cricketers